Aulis Sipponen (17 January 1929 – 5 March 2021) was a Finnish nordic skier who competed during the 1950s. At the 1952 Winter Olympics in Oslo, he finished seventh in the Nordic combined event and 16th in the 18 km cross-country skiing event. He was born in Valkjärvi and died in Orivesi.

Cross-country skiing results

Olympic Games

References

External links
Men's 18 km Olympic results: 1948-52
Nordic combined Olympic results: 1948-64

1929 births
2021 deaths
People from Priozersky District
Olympic Nordic combined skiers of Finland
Olympic cross-country skiers of Finland
Nordic combined skiers at the 1952 Winter Olympics
Cross-country skiers at the 1952 Winter Olympics
Finnish male cross-country skiers
Finnish male Nordic combined skiers
20th-century Finnish people